Theodora Kantakouzene (c. 1340 - after 1390), was the wife of Alexios III of Trebizond.

Theodora Kantakouzene may also refer to:

Theodora Raoulaina (c. 1240 – 1300), niece of Michael VIII Palaiologos and opponent of the Second Council of Lyon
Theodora Palaiologina Angelina Kantakouzene, mother of John VI Kantakouzenos
Theodora Kantakouzene, wife of Orhan (died after 1381), daughter of John VI Kantakouzenos and wife of Orhan of the Ottoman Emirate
Theodora Kantakouzene (wife of Alexios IV of Trebizond) (died 1426)

See also
Kantakouzenos family